The  is an armoured vehicle that entered service with Japan in 1996. This vehicle complements the existing fleet of tracked Type 73 Armored Personnel Carriers already in service.

Description 

The driver sits on the right side of the vehicle with the engine to his left. This position is fitted with three periscopes, the center of which can be replaced by a passive night vision periscope. For service in Iraq it appears that this position was fitted with an assembly of three windows to enable the driver to drive with his head out of the vehicle for greater situational awareness while still protected from small-arms fire. Behind him is the commander/gunner in a cupola that traverses 360° that can carry either a 40 mm grenade launcher (Type A) or a .50 caliber (12.7 mm) M2HB machine gun (Type B). The passenger compartment has space for 8 infantrymen who can use 2 firing ports on each side.

As of 2001 Japan reported to the United Nations Office for Disarmament Affairs that 72 Type 96s were in service, with an additional 22 procured that year. 365 vehicles had been produced as of 2014.

Replacement
On 10 January 2017, a new 8×8 APC prototype called the Wheeled Armoured Vehicle (Improved) was handed off to the Japanese Armed Forces to replace the 365 Type 96 vehicles in service. Developed by the Japanese Defense Ministry in collaboration with Komatsu Limited, this next generation wheeled vehicle was designed to offer more protection against improvised explosive devices (IEDs) with a similar layout to the Patria AMV and Stryker providing the Japanese Army with a family of different vehicles on a common chassis. The new vehicle proposed is longer, higher and heavier than the Type 96.

The vehicle will equip JGSDF combat and combat-support units for peacekeeping operations as well as “counter island invasion” scenarios. Trials of the prototype were intended to continue until 2019. This has since been delayed due to issues with the armor quality of the prototypes, however trials were resumed again in May 2019.

On December 9, 2022, the Japanese Ministry of Defense awarded a contract for the Patria AMV through Patria Japan.

Operators
: 365 (2014)

See also 
 Type 16 maneuver combat vehicle – another new 8x8 wheeled vehicle, similar in weight and length.

Comparable ground systems 
 Stryker
 LAV III/LAV AFV/LAV-25/ASLAV
 Amphibious Combat Vehicle
 K808 Armored Personnel Carrier
 Tusan AFV
 Boxer
 Freccia IFV
 BTR-90
 VPK-7829 Bumerang
 ZBL-08
 CM-32
 Patria AMV
 BTR-4
 Saur 2
 VBCI
 KTO Rosomak
 FNSS Pars
 MOWAG Piranha

Notes

External links 

 Type 96 on military-today.com
 Type 96 on globalsecurity.org
 excerpt from Jane's Armour and Artillery 2008

Japan Ground Self-Defense Force
Armoured personnel carriers of the post–Cold War period
Post–Cold War military equipment of Japan
Armoured personnel carriers of Japan
Komatsu Limited
Eight-wheeled vehicles
Military vehicles introduced in the 1990s
Wheeled armoured personnel carriers